Florida College is a private Christian college in Temple Terrace, Florida. It offers a variety of bachelor's degrees.

Founded in 1946, Florida College now draws its staff, faculty, and the majority of its students from non-institutional churches of Christ. The college is recognized among these churches and the community as a training center for ministers while also providing accredited programs in several high demand fields of study. The college is an autonomous educational entity not beholden to any corporate religious body; it accepts no monetary contributions from any congregation or organized religious bodies and its board members serve as individuals rather than as official representatives of any such entity.

The emphasis Florida College places on its Christian roots is expressed in its traditional chapel services held on weekdays during the academic calendar year. All members of the board of directors and all faculty members are active members in a church of Christ as prescribed by the college charter. All students take biblical courses as part of their liberal arts undergraduate curriculum.

History 
The campus is located in the center of Temple Terrace along the banks of the Hillsborough River and is surrounded by the private golf course land of the Temple Terrace Golf and Country Club founded circa 1922. One of the oldest buildings in Temple Terrace, Sutton Hall, circa 1922, is on the campus, and was originally the clubhouse for the Temple Terrace Golf and Country Club.  Another historic structure, the Student Center, which was originally the Club Morocco Nightclub and Casino, circa 1926, was razed in 2018.  Noted Tampa architect M. Leo Elliott was the architect for both buildings which were part of the original Temple Terrace Estates, one of the first Mediterranean Revival golf course planned communities in the United States (1921). According to the 1988 Temple Terrace Historic Resources Survey, both buildings were eligible for the National Register of Historic Places. After the Florida economic collapse of 1926, in the late 1930s, the property and its buildings were acquired by the Florida Bible Institute from the City of Temple Terrace before being sold to the founders of today's Florida College.

Billy Graham attended Florida Bible Institute, which owned the property now occupied by Florida College, in the late 1930s. In his autobiography he writes he received his calling "on the 18th green of the Temple Terrace Golf and Country Club". A Billy Graham Memorial Park is on the east side of the 18th green on the river.

Known as Florida Christian College, the school's charter was drafted in 1944. The school opened in fall 1946 with 100 students. The college charter stipulates the board of trustees be active in a local, generally non-institutional Church of Christ. The first president of the school was L.R. Wilson, who served from 1946 to 1949. He was followed by James R. Cope, who remained in office from 1949 until 1982. During the 1950s, the Churches of Christ debated internally whether congregations should support missions or educational institutions. This resulted in a schism and the development of non-institutional Churches of Christ, which do not offer financing to educational institutions.  Florida College was unique during these debates as the only college associated with the Churches of Christ which advocated non-institutionalism. Florida College continues to refuse donations from churches. The college supports itself entirely through the donations from individuals and the tuition paid by students.

Throughout the 1950s, the majority of the students were older men who wished to become preachers; according to David Edwin Harrell, the school "became something of a training ground for a cadre of non-institutional leaders". In 1954 the Southern Association of Colleges and Schools granted Florida College full accreditation for the Associate of Arts degree.

In the 1960s the school's recruitment policies changed, and students outside Churches of Christ were pursued. A vote by the students and staff resulted in dropping the word "Christian" from the school name in 1963.  The name change was fueled in part by the controversy that the word Christian was only used as a noun and never as an adjective in the New Testament. By the 1970s the bulk of the student body were again members of Churches of Christ, although the students were younger and more traditional than those of the 1950s.   In 1982, Bob F. Owen became president of Florida College, the position he held until 1991, when Charles G. "Colly" Caldwell III, assumed office.

At the beginning of the 2008 academic year, Caldwell announced his resignation as president of Florida College. He remains at Florida College as a tenured faculty member in the Biblical Studies department. After a nationwide search, Temple Terrace resident Harry E. "Buddy" Payne was named the fifth president of the college, effective May 22, 2009. Payne was the academic dean and vice president of the college prior to being appointed president.

Florida College added its first accredited four-year degree program, the Bachelor of Arts in Biblical Studies, in 1996. It has since added bachelor's degrees in business, communication, elementary education, history, liberal studies and music. The school plans to add a nursing program beginning in the fall of 2021.

In 2017, Florida College received an exemption to Title IX which allows it to discriminate against LGBTQ students.

Campus 
Florida College is located in Temple Terrace, Florida, approximately 20 minutes northeast of Tampa. The Hillsborough River marks the eastern edge of the main campus, which is bordered on the other three sides by the private golf course land of the Temple Terrace Golf and Country Club. Across the Hillsborough River, the college has Conn Gymnasium and its athletic fields. Immediately adjacent to the gym is an affiliated private pre-kindergarten through ninth grade school called Florida College Academy, and then a large physical plant warehouse.

The main campus includes one of the oldest buildings in the city. Sutton Hall was originally built around 1922 to serve as the clubhouse for the Temple Terrace Golf and Country Club.  The former Student Center, razed in 2018, was built around 1926, and served as the Club Morocco Nightclub and Casino. Tampa architect M. Leo Elliott designed both buildings. According to the 1988 Temple Terrace Historic Resources Survey, both buildings were eligible for the National Register of Historic Places. Economic collapse in 1926 forced their closure as recreational leisure facilities and the property passed to the Florida Bible Institute during the Great Depression. The land was then later purchased by the founders of Florida College.

The Hutchinson Auditorium, one of the more striking Mid Century Modern buildings in Temple Terrace, cost $100,000 to build in 1961 and opened on March 5, 1961. The architect was Garry Boyle of Tampa and the structure was built by the Paul Smith Construction Co. of Tampa with financing largely provided by the Hutchinson family. Most materials for the auditorium were shipped from Chattanooga, Tennessee. Hutchinson Auditorium is central to Florida College as it serves as the meeting place for weekday morning chapel assemblies at 10:15 a.m. during the school year and as a theater for major productions on campus (e.g. plays, concerts, etc.).

Two new residence halls were begun during the 2007–2008 school year and completed in the first half of the 2008–2009 academic year. Boswell Hall, which holds 320 beds, is five stories tall, and is said to be the tallest building in old Temple Terrace with a top floor view that looks out over the old city as well as the Hillsborough River. All on-campus men live in Boswell. Five-story Terrace Hall provides a new 90-bed residence hall for women. This supplements the other two residence halls for women, Hinely Hall and historic Sutton Hall.

In 2013, a project was undertaken to renovate the condemned building known as "C Dorm", the primary male dorm before Boswell. The project was completed over the summer months of 2013 and dedicated on September 22 of that year. The newly renovated building, now known as "College Hall", houses women of junior and senior standing.

Academics 
Florida College offers 17 Bachelor's degrees in the fields of biblical studies, business, communication, education, music, English, history, and liberal studies, as well as an Associate of Arts degree. The college is accredited by the Southern Association of Colleges and Schools. The student-to-faculty ratio is 11 to 1. Tuition, room and board for the 2013–14 academic year was $22,150. Eighty-two percent of the students receive financial aid.

Recruitment 
Although the bulk of its students are members of churches of Christ, Florida College does not recruit through churches since the school is founded on the principles of the non-institutional churches of Christ, which per its doctrine does not engage in congregational support of colleges. Instead, the school gains name recognition by offering 21 one-week summer camps annually in locations across the United States. Approximately 4000 children attend the summer camps, with about 400 volunteers to teach and entertain them.

Student life 
Approximately 558 students attend Florida College, representing 35 U.S. states and 6 foreign countries. Ninety percent of them are members of non-institutional Churches of Christ. More than 60% of the students are legacies with one or more of their parents or grandparents having previously attended the school. In many instances, both of a student's parents attended and met at Florida College.

Students who do not finish four years at FC often will transfer to the University of South Florida (located in nearby Tampa) or Western Kentucky University (as FC has many attendees from the Commonwealth of Kentucky).

Students are expected to adhere to a Moral Code of Conduct. As set forth in the 2015–2016 Student Handbook, the code includes among other policies: zero tolerance for "sexual activities outside of marriage," "inappropriate physical contact that is affectionate in nature, whether on or off campus," and meeting "a member of the opposite sex in any private place without permission from appropriate college personnel." Students are expected to avoid "immoral environments" such as "restaurants known for the immodest dress of staff" and "any establishment that serves alcohol and checks for identifications at their door [sic]."

Students are required to live on campus until they reach the age of 21 or have been in college for two years out of high school. In situations where an adult relative lives in the immediate vicinity this rule is sometimes relaxed. Residence halls are segregated by gender with each off limits to members of the opposite sex except in public lobbies. There are four residence halls including:
 Boswell Hall (houses all male students on campus)
 Jennifer Hall (formerly Terrace Hall, was renamed in 2015)
 Hinely Hall (built as an additional wing of Sutton Hall)
 College Hall (formerly C-Dorm, was renovated in 2013)

Athletics 

The Florida College athletic teams are called the Falcons. The college is a member of the National Association of Intercollegiate Athletics (NAIA), primarily competing as an NAIA Independent within the Continental Athletic Conference since the 2021–22 academic year. They were also a member of the United States Collegiate Athletic Association (USCAA) until the 2017–18 school year. The Falcons previously competed in the Southern States Athletic Conference (SSAC; formerly known as Georgia–Alabama–Carolina Conference (GACC) until after the 2003–04 school year) of the National Association of Intercollegiate Athletics (NAIA) from 2018–19 to 2020–21.

Florida College competes in 11 intercollegiate varsity sports: Men's sports include basketball, cross country, golf, soccer and track & field (outdoor); while women's sports include cheerleading, cross country, golf, soccer, track & field (outdoor) and volleyball.

Mascot 
Although originally represented by a pelican, the school's current mascot is the Florida College Falcon.

Band 
The school has a touring Public Relations band called the Friends, which is a reference to Florida College's original motto, "A Friend to Youth."

Men's basketball 
In the 2021–22 season, the men’s basketball team made history, finishing with a 31–4 record. They won the Continental Athletic Conference (CAC) Championship en route to the NAIA National Tournament. In the national tournament, the 9-seeded Falcons defeated the 8-seed Evangel University 75–72, for the first NAIA National Tournament win in school history. The Falcons' leading scorer, Matt Simpson, was named a 1st Team All-American as well as CAC Player of the Year for his outstanding season. Head coach Chase Teichmann was also named CAC Coach of the Year.

Alumni 
Florida College receives support from alumni across the United States. The college boasts one of the highest rates of alumni giving of any college or university in the country, something to which Florida College points to show how beloved the college is among those who have attended. For the period between 2011 and 2013, Florida College was ranked #1 by U.S. News & World Report for alumni giving, with 64.7% of alumni making financial donations to the school.

There are twenty-eight alumni clubs, including some in states as removed as Minnesota and Oregon.

The PR department under the leadership of Adam Olson created a branch of the Florida College family made specifically for the alumni to stay involved with the school. Called the "Hutchinson Bell", the program acts as an online network for alumni.

Academy 
The college also administers Florida College Academy (FCA), a K–8 private school co-located on the Temple Terrace campus. FCA shares the athletic facilities, and participates in the Tampa Bay Christian Athletic League.

See also 
 churches of Christ (non-institutional)
 Independent Colleges and Universities of Florida

References

Further reading

External links 
 
 Official athletics website

Universities and colleges affiliated with the Churches of Christ
Private universities and colleges in Florida
Educational institutions established in 1946
1946 establishments in Florida
Bible colleges
Universities and colleges accredited by the Southern Association of Colleges and Schools
Universities and colleges in Hillsborough County, Florida
Universities and colleges affiliated with the Christian churches and churches of Christ